Pier Pressure may refer to:

 Pier Pressure (album), by Chesapeake, 1997
 Pier Pressure (audio drama), a 2006 Doctor Who audio drama
 Pier Pressure (festival), a music festival held in Gothenburg, Sweden
 Pier Pressure (mixtape), by ArrDee, 2022
 "Pier Pressure", a season one episode of Arrested Development
 "Pier Pressure", a season one episode of Ben 10: Alien Force

See also
 Peer Pressure (disambiguation)
 No Pier Pressure, a 2015 studio album by Brian Wilson